The United States District Court for the Western District of Texas (in case citations, W.D. Tex.) is a federal district court. The court convenes in San Antonio with divisions in Austin, Del Rio, El Paso, Midland, Pecos, and Waco. It has jurisdiction in over 50 Trans-Pecos, Permian Basin, and Hill Country counties of the U.S. state of Texas.

Along with the District of New Mexico, Southern District of Texas, and District of Arizona, it is one of the busiest district courts in terms of criminal felony filings.

History 
The first federal judge in Texas was John C. Watrous, who was appointed on May 26, 1846, and had previously served as Attorney General of the Republic of Texas. He was assigned to hold court in Galveston, at the time, the largest city in the state. As seat of the Texas Judicial District, the Galveston court had jurisdiction over the whole state. On February 21, 1857, the state was divided into two districts, Eastern and Western, with Judge Watrous continuing in the Eastern district. Judge Watrous and Judge Thomas H. DuVal, of the Western District of Texas, left the state on the secession of Texas from the Union, the only two federal judges not to resign their posts in states that seceded. When Texas was restored to the Union, Watrous and DuVal resumed their duties and served until 1870.

Divisions 
Appeals from cases brought in the Western District of Texas are taken to the United States Court of Appeals for the Fifth Circuit (except for patent claims and claims against the U.S. government under the Tucker Act, which are appealed to the Federal Circuit).

The divisions of the Western District of Texas are:

 Austin Division comprises the following counties: Bastrop, Blanco, Burleson, Burnet, Caldwell, Gillespie, Hays, Kimble, Lampasas, Lee, Llano, Mason, McCulloch, San Saba, Travis, Washington and Williamson.
 Del Rio Division comprises the following counties: Edwards, Kinney, Maverick, Terrell, Uvalde, Val Verde and Zavala.
 El Paso Division comprises the following counties: El Paso and Hudspeth.
 Midland-Odessa Division comprises the following counties: Andrews, Crane, Ector, Martin, Midland and Upton.
 Pecos Division comprises the following counties: Brewster, Culberton, Jeff Davis, Loving, Pecos, Presidio, Reeves, Ward and Winkler.
 San Antonio Division comprises the following counties: Atascosa, Bandera, Bexar, Comal, Dimmit, Frio, Gonzales, Guadalupe, Karnes, Kendall, Kerr, Medina, Real and Wilson.
 Waco Division comprises the following counties: Bell, Bosque, Coryell, Falls, Freestone, Hamilton, Hill, Leon, Limestone, McLennan, Milam, Robertson and Somervell.

The United States Attorney's Office for the Western District of Texas represents the United States in civil and criminal litigation in the court.  the United States Attorney is Jaime E. Esparza.

Notable Cases
Kocurek Assassination Attempt: Judge Lee Yeakel presided over the case of Chimene Onyeri, an aspiring Houston rapper who attempted to assassinate of Travis County district judge Julie Kocurek after she previously sentenced him for probation violation and a criminal theft and fraud enterprise he ran, having shot her as she and her son were returning home from a football game at his high school before she was about to sentence him. After his many associates testified of his schemes, a federal jury convicted Onyeri on 17 counts of fraud, theft, racketeering and attempted murder and sentenced him to life in prison.

Current judges 
:

Vacancies and pending nominations

Former judges

Chief judges

Succession of seats

See also 
 Courts of Texas
 List of current United States district judges
 List of United States federal courthouses in Texas

References

External links 
 U.S. District Court for the Western District of Texas

Texas, Western District
Texas law
Val Verde County, Texas
El Paso, Texas
Midland, Texas
Reeves County, Texas
San Antonio
Waco, Texas
Austin, Texas
Courthouses in Texas
1857 establishments in Texas
Courts and tribunals established in 1857